Lucius Cornelius Scipio may refer to:
Lucius Cornelius Scipio (consul 350 BC)
Lucius Cornelius Scipio (consul 259 BC)
Lucius Cornelius Scipio (praetor 174 BC)
Lucius Cornelius Scipio Asiaticus, consul in 190 BC, victor of the Battle of Magnesia (190 BC)
Lucius Cornelius Scipio Asiaticus (consul 83 BC)
Lucius Cornelius Scipio Barbatus, consul 298 BC and patrician censor 280 BC

See also
 
Cornelius Scipio (disambiguation)